Castiglione Messer Raimondo (locally Castiùne) is a town and comune in the province of Teramo, Abruzzo, central Italy.

It is a medieval borough near the Gran Sasso d'Italia massif. Economy is mostly based on agriculture.

References

Cities and towns in Abruzzo